Orlaya is a genus of flowering plants from Europe in the family Apiaceae, with between 1 and 11 species. They are annuals with finely-divided leaves, and umbels of lacy pink or white flowers. O. grandiflora, white laceflower, is well-known and widely cultivated as an ornamental in the UK and elsewhere. It has gained the Royal Horticultural Society’s Award of Garden Merit. 

The following species are currently accepted:-
Orlaya daucorlaya Murb.
Orlaya grandiflora (L.) Hoffm.
Orlaya kochii Heywood
Orlaya topaliana Beauverd

References

Apioideae
Apioideae genera